The Church of St. Andrew is a Roman Catholic parish church in the Roman Catholic Archdiocese of New York, located at 20 Cardinal Hayes Place, Manhattan, New York City. It was established in 1842. The present building was erected in 1939 through a joint effort involving Maginnis & Walsh and Robert J. Reiley in the Georgian Revival architectural style.

In August 2015 St. Andrew's parish merged with that of Our Lady of Victory on William Street to form the Parish of Our Lady of Victory and St. Andrew. As of 2019, weekday Masses continued to be held twice a day at St. Andrew's.

History
St. Andrew's parish was founded by Rev. Andrew Byrne. Local Catholics had purchased the old Universalist Church, known as Carroll Hall, which then Bishop John Hughes dedicated on March 19, 1842. In 1844, Byrne was named the first bishop of the Diocese of Little Rock. In 1858 extensive street improvements carried away so much of the old structure that it was found necessary to purchase the adjoining lot. According to Remigius Lafort, George Washington once dwelt in a house on this site. The remodeled St. Andrew's was dedicated October 20, 1861.

On February 25, 1875, during a Lenten service at which about 1200 worshippers were assembled, the building next to the church suddenly collapsed. As a result, the roof of Saint Andrew's cave idn on those gathered, killing five and injuring at least 29.

"Printers' Mass
Father Luke Evers initiated the "Printers' Mass", held at 2:30 a.m. on Sunday morning. An adaptation approved by Pope Leo XIII, this allowed Catholic workers at nearby Printing House Square, where The Sun, The New York Telegram, The New York Times, and the New York World newspapers were then published, to fulfill their Sunday obligation by stopping by on their way home after the Saturday night press runs. The "Printers Mass" also drew railway workers, postal employees, policemen, firefighters, brewery and saloon workers. The practice soon spread to other cities. This tradition continued for more than 50 years, and the church became known as "The Printers' Church. Some six years later a similar accommodation would be made for the theatrical community with the establishment of the "Actors' Chapel" at St. Malachy's.

Evers was also chaplain at The Tombs.

Pastors
 Fr. Andrew Byrne, 1842-1844
 Fr. John Maginnis, 1844-1850
 Fr. Michael Curran, 1850-1880
 Fr. James McMahon, 1880-1891
 Fr. James Fitzsimmons, 1891-1898
 Fr. Luke Evers, 1898 -

Description
In 1892, the address listed was on Duane Street at the corner of City Hall Place (now Cardinal Hayes Place). The present building was erected in 1939 through a joint effort involving the famous Boston firm Maginnis & Walsh and Robert J. Reiley of New York. It is one of the best examples of the Georgian Revival architectural style in New York. St. Andrew is the only New York City church to be designed by Maginnis & Walsh. The church was erected near the site of the infamous Five Points slum. The selection of the site for the church was near where Cardinal Hayes was born.

The church is located near New York City Hall and 1 Police Plaza, along with several other courthouses such as the New York County Courthouse and Thurgood Marshall United States Courthouse.  Above the entrance to the church, an inscription in Latin reads "Beati qvi ambvlant in lege Domini," which means "Blessed are they who walk in the law of the Lord." On April 8, 2018, the priest announced they would no longer be hosting any weekend masses.

References

External links

 Our Lady of Victory and the Church of St. Andrew website

1842 establishments in New York (state)
Civic Center, Manhattan
Georgian Revival architecture in New York City
Religious organizations established in 1842
Robert J. Reiley church buildings
Roman Catholic churches completed in 1939
Roman Catholic churches in Manhattan
20th-century Roman Catholic church buildings in the United States